Travis Fieldyen Mills (born April 14, 1987) is a retired United States Army soldier who became a quadruple amputee while serving in Afghanistan. He speaks across the country, motivating others to live by his motto: "Never give up. Never quit." He has also established a foundation to build a retreat for other special-needs veterans injured in combat and their families.

Early life
Mills grew up in Vassar, Michigan, United States. After graduating from high school, he joined the United States Army and was assigned to the 82nd Airborne Division, where he rose to the rank of staff sergeant. During his three tours of duty in Afghanistan, Mills was awarded the Purple Heart and Bronze Star medals.

Third tour in Afghanistan
On April 10, 2012, Mills was critically injured by an improvised explosive device (IED) on his third tour in Afghanistan, losing portions of both legs and both arms. He is one of only five quadruple amputees from the wars in Iraq and Afghanistan to survive such extensive injuries.

Post-military career

Mills has written a New York Times bestselling memoir titled Tough As They Come. A documentary film, Travis: A Soldier's Story, is now available online. He is the founder and Board President of the Travis Mills Foundation. The foundation raised $2.75 million in donations to rehabilitate Elizabeth Arden's Maine Chance Lodge, turning it into a fully accessible, free retreat for special-needs veterans and their families. In the summer of 2017, the Veterans Retreat hosted over 56 combat injured veterans. His story is set to be the subject of a major motion picture which is expected to be directed by Sylvester Stallone, who will also co-star with Adam Driver.

Personal life
Mills currently resides in Maine with his wife Kelsey, his daughter Chloe, and his son Dax.

References

1987 births
American amputees
American memoirists
Quadruple amputees
United States Army soldiers
Living people
People from Vassar, Michigan
Military personnel from Michigan